Hong Yi (23 October 1880 – 13 October 1942; , or Hung Yit and ), born Li Shutong (李叔同 and 李漱筒) was a Chinese Buddhist monk, artist and art teacher. He also went by the names Wen Tao, Guang Hou, and Shu Tong, but was most commonly known by his Buddhist name, Hong Yi. He was a master painter, musician, dramatist, calligrapher, seal cutter, poet, and Buddhist monk.

Life

He was born in Tianjin to a banking family originating in Hongtong County, Shanxi, that migrated to Tianjin in the Ming Dynasty, though his mother was from Pinghu, Zhejiang province.

In 1898 Li moved to Shanghai and joined the "Shanghai Painting and Calligraphy Association", and the "Shanghai Scholarly Society" while he was attending the Nanyang Public School (later became Jiaotong University). In 1905 Li went to Japan to study at Tokyo School of Fine Art in Ueno Park where he specialized in Western painting and music, and met a lover by the name of Yukiko who was to become his concubine. In 1910 Li returned to China and was appointed to Tianjin's Beiyang Advanced Industry School. The next year he was appointed as a music teacher in a girls' school in Shanghai. He went to Hangzhou in 1912 and became a lecturer in the Zhejiang Secondary Normal College (now Hangzhou Normal University). He taught not only Western painting and music but also art history. By 1915 Jiang Qian hired him as a teacher at Nanjing Higher Normal School (renamed in 1949 to Nanjing University), where he taught painting and music. He also taught at Zhejiang Secondary Normal School (浙江兩級師範學堂), the predecessor of the famous Hangzhou High School.

During these later years, Li's reputation grew, as he became the first Chinese educator to use nude models in his painting classes, not to mention as the first teacher of Western music in China. Some of the students, like Singapore artist Chen Wen Hsi (陳文希）whom he personally groomed, went on to become accomplished masters of the arts in their later days. Li Shutong himself was also an accomplished composer and lyricist. Many of his compositions are still remembered and performed today.

In 1916 refuge in the Three Jewels of Buddhism. After spending another year there, Li began a new chapter in his life by choosing to be ordained as a monk, and thus began a holistic life dedicated to propagating Buddhism and its code of conduct. After becoming a monk he practised only calligraphy, developing a simple and unadorned, yet unique style, which was treasured by everyone who received a sample. He became known to all as Master Hong Yi. In 1942, Master Hong Yi died peacefully at the age of 61 in Quanzhou, Fujian Province. Li is one of the three great poetic monks in the late Qing Dynasty.(others for Su Manshu, Shi Jingan).

Commemorations and exhibitions
Beijing-based progressive-metal rock band the Tang Dynasty recorded a rock-version of Master Hong Yi's famous romantic ballad, the Farewell song in their second album Epic.

A special 130th anniversary celebration of Master Hong Yi showcasing his calligraphy and painting works took place in 2010 in Shanghai, partly sponsored by the Pinghu Municipal Government, and attended by a granddaughter of Hong Yi.

Important works
Publications
A Graphical Explanation of the Bhikhhu's Precepts in Dharmagupta Vinaya (Chinese: 四分律比丘戒相表記)
The Guide to the Nanshan Vinaya for Lay Buddhists (Chinese: 南山律在家備覽)

Collections
Happy Stones
Li Shutong's Seals

Articles
How to Paint (Chinese: 圖畫修得法)
An Introduction to Watercolors  (Chinese: 水彩畫法說略)

Lyrics
Song: Song Bie Ge (Farewell Song) (Chinese: 送别歌)

Music
Song: Childhood memories (Chinese: 憶兒時)
Song: Song of Spring Sightseeing (Chinese: 春游曲)
Song: Song of Three Jewels (Buddhist Refuge), Taixu lyrics (Chinese: :zh:三寶歌)

See also

 Feng Zikai
 Huineng
 Yemek Sanatı (Turkish)

References

Master Hong Yi and his calligraphy and painting

1880 births
1942 deaths
Qing dynasty painters
Hangzhou High School alumni
Qing dynasty Buddhist monks
Republic of China musicians
Republic of China Buddhist monks
Painters from Tianjin
Qing dynasty calligraphers
Republic of China calligraphers
Musicians from Tianjin
20th-century Chinese painters
19th-century Chinese people
20th-century Chinese people
Buddhist artists
Chinese music educators
Chinese art educators
Tokyo University of the Arts alumni
National Chiao Tung University (Shanghai) alumni
20th-century Buddhist monks